Thais in Japan consist of Thai migrants that come to Japan, as well as their descendants. In in June 2022, there were 54,618 Thais living in Japan.

History 
There were some contacts between the Ryūkyū Kingdom and the Ayutthaya Kingdom which dates far as the 15th century. Some trade between the two countries were successfully done during the 17th century, as the Japanese community in Ayutthaya began. Though, when Japan made a policy of sakoku in 1639, the Japanese community began to fade out. In 1887, Japan and Siam began a new history with the Declaration of Amity and Commerce.

Notable Thai Temples in Japan 
 Wat Paknam Japan
 Wat Buddharangsi Tokyo
 Wat Phra Dhammakaya Osaka

Notable people 
 Bunshiri, television personality (Thai, lives in Japan)
 Kanita Matsuo, radio speaker (Thai, lives in Japan)
 Manami Oda, gyaru model (Thai parent)
 Eri Otoguro, actress (Thai parent)
 Shōta Kaito, sumō wrestler (Thai mother)
 Yurina Katō, television personality (Thai parent)
 Arisa Kotoi, idol (Thai/Japanese mother, raised in Japan)
 Tsubasa Sakakibara, baseball player (Thai mother, raised in Japan)
 Yasuo Sano, baseball player (Thai parent)
 Maki Shima, fashion model (Thai parent)
 Heebthong Krissada, baseball player (Thai mother)
 Hitomi Suzuki, idol (Thai mother)
 Masato Seto, photographer (Vietnamese-Thai mother)
 Mina Tanaka, soccer player (Thai mother)
 Chanana Sarina, fashion model (Thai mother)
 Kōji Mukai, television personality (Thai mother)
 Hiroki Yamada, baseball player (Thai mother)
 Amnaj Khaokhrueamuang, tourism scholar (Thai, lives in Japan)
 Attakarn Wongchanamas, diplomat (Thai, lives in Japan)
 Yokthai Sithoar, muay thai player (Thai, lives in Japan)
 Sorut Sukthaworn, diplomat (Thai, lives in Japan)
 Chanathip Songkrasin, soccer player (Thai, lives in Japan)
 Krit Tankanarat, diplomat (Thai, lived in Japan)
 Vichit Chitvimarn, diplomat (Thai, lived in Japan)
 Pavin Chatchawanpongpun, diplomat (Thai, lives in Japan)
 Chutong Weerasakreck, muay thai player (Thai, lives in Japan)
 Teerasil Dangda, soccer player (Thai, lived in Japan)
 Thitiphan Puangchan, soccer player (Thai, lived in Japan)
 Theerathorn Bunmathan, soccer player (Thai, lived in Japan)

In fiction 
 Apachai Hopachai, in the anime series Kenichi: The Mightiest Disciple
 Charunee Kusakabe, in the anime series Heaven's Memo Pad
 Phichit Chulanont, in the anime series Yuri on Ice

References 

Ethnic groups in Japan
Japan
 
Thai
 
Japan–Thailand relations